Mixed-ish (stylized as ish) is an American single-camera sitcom created by Kenya Barris, Peter Saji and Tracee Ellis Ross that premiered on ABC on September 24, 2019. The series is a prequel to Black-ish, and the second series to be spun off from the parent series after the Freeform series Grown-ish. In May 2020, the series was renewed for a second season, which premiered on January 26, 2021. In May 2021, the series was canceled after two seasons.

Premise
Loosely based on the early life of Dr. Rania Barris (co-creator Kenya Barris' ex-wife), Mixed-ish chronicles Rainbow Johnson's childhood years as she recounts her experience growing up in a mixed-race family in the 1980s. The family faces dilemmas over whether to assimilate or stay true to themselves when Rainbow's parents move from a hippie commune to the suburbs in 1985.

Cast

Main
 Arica Himmel as Rainbow Sojourner "Bow" Johnson, a 12-year-old preteen who is coming into her own while embracing her biracial heritage.
 Tracee Ellis Ross as adult Rainbow Johnson (narration), who details her background and actual real-life events in each episode.
 Tika Sumpter as Alicia Johnson, Bow's mother who works hard as a lawyer at her father-in-law's practice and helps Bow embrace her African-American heritage.
 Mark-Paul Gosselaar as Paul Johnson, Bow's father. Paul is a stay-at-home white dad and is always there for the family. In season 2 he starts working as a teacher.
 Gary Cole as Harrison Johnson III, Bow's paternal grandfather; Paul's father. He died in 2007.
 Christina Anthony as Denise, Bow's maternal aunt; Alicia's sister. A very-loving woman from Tennessee who is not afraid to express her African-American heritage (since her idea of culture is "influenced" by 227 and Eddie Murphy), even though she tends to be stereotypical towards the family's biracial culture.
 Mykal-Michelle Harris as Santamonica Johnson, Rainbow's younger sister with a sassy attitude.
 Rashida Jones as adult Santamonica Johnson (in fast-forward clips)
 Ethan William Childress as Johan Johnson, Rainbow's brother, who has started to adopt a street culture and muscular attitude.
 Daveed Diggs as adult Johan Johnson (in fast-forward clips)

Recurring
Paulet Del Castillo as Michaela
Caitlin Kimball as Ms. Collins
Trinitee Stokes as Tamika
Isabel Myers as Rebecca
Luca Luhan as Bryce

Guest
 Anthony Anderson as Andre "Dre" Johnson, Bow's future husband ("Becoming Bow", "Doctor! Doctor!", "Forever Young")
 Marcus Scribner as Andre "Junior" Johnson, Bow's future oldest son ("Becoming Bow")
 Miles Brown as Jack Johnson, Bow's future second oldest son ("Becoming Bow")
 Marsai Martin as Diane Johnson, Bow's future youngest daughter ("Becoming Bow")
 Austin and Berlin Gross as Devante Johnson, Bow's future youngest son ("Becoming Bow")
 Blake Anderson as Shaman Dave ("Becoming Bow")
 Dallas Young as Rodney ("Let Your Hair Down")
 Leiloni Arrie Pharms as Young Denise ("Love Is a Battlefield")
 Daria Johns as Shanice ("It's Tricky")
 Carolyne Maraghi as Wendy Whiteman ("Weird  Science")
 Wayne Brady as Geoffrey, a geologist and Denise's boyfriend ("Every Little Step")

Episodes

Season 1 (2019–20)

Season 2 (2021)

Development
On May 2, 2019, it was announced that the Black-ish episode that was set to air May 7, 2019, would be shelved. The episode, titled "Becoming Bow", introduces a younger version of the character Rainbow living with her family, and will instead serve as the pilot episode for the new series, with the cast of the parent show appearing in a flash-forward cameo introduction. On May 14, 2019, it was announced that the series would premiere in the Fall of 2019 and air on Tuesdays at 9:00 P.M. The series premiered on September 24, 2019.

Tracee Ellis Ross, who plays the adult Bow in Black-ish, will serve as both an executive producer and narrator for the series, with flagship costars Anthony Anderson and Laurence Fishburne also executive producing. Mixed-ish is the final series that Barris helped create prior to signing his deal with Netflix in August 2018. Barris had asked for an exit from his ABC Studios deal because of the studio's handling of controversial Black-ish episodes and of rejected pilots he had helped put together.

Anders Holm was originally set to play Bow's father, Paul Jackson, and played the role in the series’ pilot episode, but he left the series before it was picked up by ABC. On June 19, 2019, Mark-Paul Gosselaar replaced Holm in the Paul Jackson role, and scenes with Holm in the "Becoming Bow" episode-turned-pilot were subsequently reshot with Gosselaar.

In the promos, the family is called "the Johnsons" (the same surname as Bow's family on Black-ish), even though the surname of the characters Harrison and Paul is Jackson, which implies that Bow's maternal family still uses the name Johnson. This was brought up during the Black-ish second season episode "Johnson & Johnson," in which Dre learns that Bow never formally took his last name after their marriage. In addition, the episodes listed are named after songs, television shows, and movies that were made during the 1980s.

On October 28, 2019, the series received a full season order of 23 episodes.

On May 21, 2020, ABC renewed the series for a second season which premiered on January 26, 2021. On May 14, 2021, ABC canceled the series after two seasons.

Release

Marketing
On May 14, 2019, ABC released the first official trailer for the series.

Music
On August 5, 2019, singer-songwriter Mariah Carey confirmed that she recorded the series' theme song, entitled "In the Mix." The song was written and produced by Carey and songwriter-producer Daniel Moore and reached number nine on the Billboard U.S. R&B Digital Song Sales chart.

During a panel discussion with Barris and Carey, Barris explained that he wants Carey to appear as a guest on the show.

Reception

Critical response
On review aggregator Rotten Tomatoes, Mixed-ish  holds an approval rating of 76% based on 21 reviews, with an average rating of 7.10/10. The website's critical consensus reads, "While it needs more time to establish its own comedic voice, mixed-ish and its appealing cast are off to a sweet and smart start." On Metacritic, it has a weighted average score of 70 out of 100, based on 9 critics, indicating "generally favorable reviews".

Ratings

Season 1

Season 2

Notes

References

External links
 

Black-ish
American Broadcasting Company original programming
English-language television shows
2010s American single-camera sitcoms
2010s American black sitcoms
2020s American single-camera sitcoms
2020s American black sitcoms
2019 American television series debuts
2021 American television series endings
Fiction about interracial romance
Nonlinear narrative television series
American prequel television series
American television spin-offs
Television series by ABC Studios
Television shows set in Los Angeles
Television series set in the 1980s
Television series about families
Race and ethnicity in television